Koloth Thattarath Sukumaran, popularly known as Sukumar Azhikode (26 May 1926 – 24 January 2012) was an Indian academic, orator, critic and writer of Malayalam literature, known for his contributions to Malayalam language and insights on Indian philosophy. He was a scholar in Sanskrit, Malayalam, and English languages and his work, Tatvamasi, published in 1984, is a notable work for its detailed interpretation of Indian philosophy, Vedas and Upanishads. He was a recipient of several honours including Sahitya Akademi Award, Kerala Sahithya Akademi Award, Vayalar Award, Vallathol Award and Ezhuthachan Puraskaram, the highest literary award of the Government of Kerala. The Government of India awarded him the fourth highest civilian honour of the Padma Shri in 2007, which he refused citing the award was a discrimination.

Biography 
Sukumar Azhikode, was born on May 12, 1926, at Azhikode, a coastal village in Kannur district of the south Indian state of Kerala to Vidwan Panankavil Damodharan, a teacher, and his wife, Koloth Thattarathu Madhaviyamma, as the fourth of their six children. His early schooling was at Azhikode South Elementary School and he passed intermediate examination from Rajas High School Chirakkal in 1941 before studying ayurveda at Kottakkal Arya Vaidya Patasala for one year. Subsequently, he joined St. Aloysius College, Mangalore from where he graduated in commerce in 1943. He started his career as a clerk at the Kannur branch of Indian Overseas Bank but soon quit the job to pursue a teaching career for which he completed the teachers' training course from Government College of Teacher Education, Kozhikode (GCTE) and joined his alma mater, Rajas High School, Chirakkal, as a teacher in 1948. While serving as a teacher, he continued his studies through distance education and earned master's degrees in Sanskrit and Malayalam languages. He followed it up with a bachelor's degree in education from GCTE in 1952. During the next three and a half decades, he worked at various institutions, starting with St. Joseph's College, Devagiri and St. Aloysius College, Mangalore as a lecturer, as the principal at SNM Training College, Moothakunnam, before joining the University of Calicut as the founder head and professor of the department of Malayalam. In between, he secured a PhD in Malayalam literature in 1981, for his thesis, Western Influence in Malayalam Literary Criticism. Later, he served as the pro vice chancellor and acting vice chancellor of the university.

Sukumar Azhikode lived a bachelor throughout his life; his relationship with Vilasini teacher, to whom he had proposed, did not result in a marriage. He lived in Eravimangalam near Thrissur, towards the later part of his life and died on 24 January 24, 2012, at Amala Institute of Medical Sciences. He was 85 years old and was suffering from bone cancer for which he had been hospitalized since 7 December 2011.

Literary career 

Sukumar Azhikode, considered by many as the leading Malayalam literary critic after the era of Joseph Mundassery, M. P. Paul and Kuttikrishna Marar and one of the greatest Malayalam orators, wrote a number of books on literary criticism, philosophy and social issues, including Thatvamasi, a treatise on Indian philosophy, Vedas and Upanishads which received 12 awards; the book also paved way for another book, Thathwamasi Prabhashanangal, a compilation of four speeches made by Azhikode on the book. Six of his books are on Malayalam literature,; Malayala Sahityavimarsanam (Criticism of Malayalam Literature) and Malayala Sahitya Patanangal (Studies on Malayalam Literature) are general studies, two others, Shankarakkuruppu Vimarshikkappedunnu (Sankara Kurup Critiqued) and Mahakavi Ulloor (The Great Poet Ulloor) are studies of the works of G. Sankara Kurup and Ulloor S. Parameswara Iyer while the remaining two, Aasaante Seethaakaavyam (Asan's Seetha Kavyam) and Ramananum Malayalakavitayum (Ramanan and Malayalam Poetry) are critical analysis of two classic poems, Chinthavishtayaya Seetha of Kumaran Asan and Ramanan of Changampuzha Krishna Pillai. Besides several studies on various topics, he also published a book compiling some of his orations under the title, Azhikodinte Prabhashanangal(Orations of Azhikode) and Azhikodinte Phalithangal (Jokes of Azhikode) which narrates his jokes and their situations. He also translated Mark Twain's The Adventures of Huckleberry Finn into Malayalam under the title, Huckleberry Finninte Vikramangal.

Social activism and controversies 
Sukumar Azhikode was an active commentator on the changes in the society and his speeches on the demolition of the Babri Masjid were reported to have been notable; his speeches regularly featured comments on historical figures such as Buddha, Jesus Christ, Muhammad, Gandhiji and Ram Manohar Lohia. He was also vocal on contemporaries including V. S. Achuthanandan, G. Sankara Kurup and K. Karunakaran, among others. His war of words with Mohanlal, the Malayalam film actor, drew public interest, and led to Azhikode serving a legal notice on the actor. He was also involved in public exchanges of differences with Vellapally Natesan, the general secretary of Sree Narayana Trust and Innocent, the film actor and contested an election to the Lok Sabha, unsuccessfully, the only time he was involved in active politics.

Awards and honours 

Sukumar Azhikode received the Kerala Sahitya Akademi Award for literary criticism in 1984 for his work, Malayala Sahitya Vimarshanam; a year later, Akademi honoured him again with their award for miscellaneous works; Thatvamasi earning him the award. Thatvamasi received another honour the next year in the form of 1985 Sahitya Akademi Award, followed by yet another award, Vayalar Award in 1989. He was the recipient of the 1997 DALA Award of the Dubai Art Lovers Association. The Government of Kerala awarded him for their highest literary honour, the Ezhuthachan Puraskaram, in 2004 and the Government of India selected him for the fourth highest civilian award of the Padma Shri in 2007. However, Azhikode refused the award, citing that the gradation of civilian honours were a form of discrimination. He was also a recipient of the Vallathol Award which he received in 2007 and the Rajaji Award. The Government of Kerala acquired the property of Sukumar Azhikode in 2013 and set up a memorial for him. The memorial holds a museum where his books and personal belongings are on display. Another memorial for the writer has been set up at Payyambalam Beach by Sukumar Azhikode Cultural Center and a Kannur-based cultural association has instituted an annual award, Sukumar Azhikode Memorial Award; M. Mukundan, K. Jayakumar and Sreekumaran Thampi are some of the recipients of the award.

Bibliography 

 
 
 
 
 
 
 
 
 
 
 
 
 
 
 
 
 
 
 
 </ref>
 
 
 
 Entinu Bharatadare
 Azhikodinte Phalitangal (Jokes of Azhikode)
 Mahakavi Ulloor (The Great Poet Ulloor)

Memoirs and personal writings

Translations

See also 
 List of Indian writers

References

External links 

 
 
 

1926 births
2012 deaths
Writers from Thrissur
Malayalam literary critics
Malayalam-language writers
People from Kozhikode district
Recipients of the Ezhuthachan Award
Recipients of the Sahitya Akademi Award in Malayalam
Indian Sanskrit scholars
Deaths from cancer in India
Academic staff of the University of Calicut
Malayalam-language journalists
Journalists from Kerala
20th-century Indian journalists
20th-century Indian philosophers
Recipients of the Kerala Sahitya Akademi Award